Jimmy Gordon (born August 1, 1991) is an American football linebacker who is currently a free agent. He has also played for the Jacksonville Sharks and the Tampa Bay Storm.

College career
Gordon committed to the University at Buffalo and played four years for the Buffalo Bulls football team at tight end.

Professional career
Gordon signed with the Jacksonville Sharks for the 2015 Arena Football League season, converting from a tight end to play linebacker, a position he had not played since high school. He recorded 10 tackles before being placed on injured reserve to end the year. Gordon spent the 2016 Arena Football League season with the Tampa Bay Storm as the team's starting Mac linebacker, recording 33 tackles and 2 sacks on the season. On January 13, 2017, Gordon signed with the Washington Valor for the 2017 Arena Football League season. On April 1, 2019, Gordon was again assigned to the Valor.

References

External links

arenafootball.com profile
arenafan.com profile
Buffalo Bulls bio

1991 births
Living people
People from Patchogue, New York
Players of American football from New York (state)
American football linebackers
American football tight ends
Buffalo Bulls football players
Jacksonville Sharks players
Tampa Bay Storm players
Washington Valor players